Viscount Limerick may refer to two different viscountcies in the Peerage of Ireland:
 Viscount of [the City of] Limerick
 created in 1719 for James Hamilton MP (1694–1758) who was made 1st Earl of Clanbrassil in 1756;
 1756–1758 courtesy title for his son James Hamilton (1730–1798), later the 2nd (and last) Earl of Clanbrassil
 Viscount Limerick
 created in 1800 for Edmund Henry Pery, 2nd Baron Glentworth, who was made 1st Earl of Limerick in 1803; 
 although the  Earl of Limerick's subsidiary titles are therefore Viscount Limerick and Baron Glentworth, his eldest son is in fact styled "Viscount Glentworth"